The Toronto and York Radial Railway was a transit operator providing services to the suburbs of Toronto, Ontario, Canada. It was a subsidiary of the Toronto Railway Company. The company was created by merging four Toronto-area interurban operations. The company was part of the empire of railway entrepreneurs Sir William Mackenzie and Donald Mann which included the Canadian Northern Railway and the parent Toronto Railway Company.

Lines
The table lists the 4 lines composing the T&YRR. Each line became a separate division of the T&YRR except for the Schomberg and Aurora which was a branch of the Metropolitan Division. Click on the predecessor company name for further details about each line. In 1904, the four predecessor companies were merged to form the Toronto and York Radial Railway.

Timeline

Pre-T&YRR era (1885–1904)
Events prior to the merger creating the T&YRR in 1904 
In 1885, the Metropolitan Street Railway Company of Toronto (incorporated March 2, 1877, renamed Metropolitan Railway Company in 1897) started a horsecar line on Yonge Street.

On September 1890, electric service began on the Metropolitan line.

On 16 July 16, 1892, the Toronto and Mimico Electric Railway and Light Company (incorporated November 14, 1890) began initial service between Sunnyside (Toronto) and the Humber River.

On July 1, 1893, the Toronto and Scarboro' Electric Railway, Light and Power Company (incorporated August 18, 1892) started electric, radial operations.

On July 5, 1893, the Toronto Railway Company acquired controlling interest in the Toronto and Mimico Electric Railway and Light Company.

On July 10, 1893, the Toronto and Mimico Electric Railway and Light Company extended service from Humber River to Mimico Creek, and further to Etobicoke Creek (Long Branch) on September 29, 1893.

On March 6, 1895, the Toronto Railway Company acquired controlling interest in the Toronto and Scarboro' Electric Railway, Light and Power Company.

By 1899, the Metropolitan line was extended to Aurora and Newmarket.

In 1903, Toronto and Mimico Electric Railway and Light Company changed its name to the Toronto and Mimico Railway Company.

Mackenzie & Mann era (1904–1921)
Events when the T&YRR was under the control of William Mackenzie and Donald Mann 
On August 1, 1904, the T&YRR merged four rail operations, converting them into three T&YRR divisions, with the Metropolitan Division having a branch line:

 Metropolitan Street Railway to become the T&YRR Metropolitan Division
 Schomberg and Aurora Railway to become the Schomberg and Aurora Branch of the Metropolitan Division
 Toronto and Scarboro' Electric Railway, Light and Power Company to become the T&YRR Scarboro Division
 Toronto and Mimico Electric Railway and Light Company to become the T&YRR Mimico Division

In 1904, regular passenger service started on the Schomberg and Aurora Branch of the T&YRR's Metropolitan Division. At this time, the line operated with steam trains.

On December 24, 1905, the Mimico line was extended from Long Branch to Port Credit.

On June 1, 1907, the T&YRR opened a  extension of the Metropolitan line from Newmarket to Jackson's Point.

On January 1, 1909, the T&YRR opened a  extension of the Metropolitan line from Jackson's Point to Sutton.

On June 25, 1915, a City of Toronto work team ripped up the tracks of the Metropolitan Line along Yonge Street from the CPR crosstown line north to Farnham Avenue. This was a result of a dispute between the city led by Mayor Tommy Church and the T&YRR. Mayor Church complained about the "inadequate services provided by the Mackenzie-Mann traction companies" which included the Toronto Railway Company as well as the T&YRR.

In 1916, electrification of the Schomberg and Aurora Branch was completed.

In 1921, a plebiscite approved the purchase by the City of Toronto of the Toronto Railway Company and the T&YRR. The Toronto Transportation Commission was to operate all radial lines within the city limits.

On September 1, 1921, the TTC took over operation of all streetcar operations in the city, and shortly after took control those portions of the Scarboro and Mimico radial within the city limits.

By fall, 1921, the TTC took over the portion of the Metropolitan line on Yonge Street south of Glen Echo Road (at the city limit).

Hydro Electric era (1922–1927)
Events when the T&YRR was managed by Hydro-Electric Railways 
In August, 1922, the City of Toronto formally acquired the T&YRR lines.

On November 1, 1922, operation of the T&YRR was taken over by Hydro Electric Power Commission of Ontario and run as the Hydro-Electric Railways: Toronto and York Division. Hydro made improvements to both the Metropolitan and Mimico lines.

At the end of 1923, the T&YRR under Hydro management had a deficit. The City blamed Hydro mismanagement. Hydro blamed the TTC's acquisition of the profitable portions of the radial lines within the city limits.

By 1925, Toronto City Council felt that integrating the radials within TTC operations would produce efficiency by avoiding duplication of carhouses and shops, by allowing the transfer of vehicles between radial and city lines to meet passenger demand, and by having firmer control over expenditures.

TTC era (1927–1948)
Events when the TTC operated the T&YRR lines 
On January 12, 1927, the Toronto Transportation Commission started operating the T&YRR lines under contract with operations being the responsibility of the TTC's new Radial Department. Along with 3 radial lines, the TTC acquired 54 double-ended radial cars.

In June 1927, the Schomberg line was closed.

On March 16, 1930, the TTC closed the Metropolitan line.

On July 17, 1930, the TTC reopened a portion of the defunct Lake Shore line between Richmond Hill and Toronto as the North Yonge Railways. This line was owned by area municipalities and operated under contract by the TTC.

On February 9, 1935, the Long Branch-Port Credit radial service ended.

On June 25, 1936, the Scarborough radial service ended.

On October 9, 1948, service was terminated on the North Yonge Railways, the last surviving Toronto radial.

Track gauge
Both Toronto gauge and standard gauge were used. The T&Y radial lines did not use a common gauge until the TTC took over the operation of the surviving lines in 1927 in order to connect the radial lines to the Toronto streetcar system.

The Metropolitan radial line started off with Toronto gauge in 1885, but switched to standard gauge after the Metropolitan Street Railway Company received provincial permission in 1895 to use any gauge it pleased. Standard gauge allowed the Metropolitan to exchange freight cars with steam railways. When the TTC took over the line in 1927, it converted the line to Toronto gauge but built a short section of four-rail, dual-gauge track in Aurora to deliver freight cars to a factory there.

The Mimico radial line used Toronto gauge until 1922 when the Hydro-Electric Railways converted the line to standard gauge. When the TTC took over the line in 1927, it converted the line back to Toronto gauge.

The Scarboro radial line used only Toronto gauge throughout its years of operations.

The Schomberg and Aurora line used only standard gauge throughout its years of operations.

Electrical system
The system initially used 550 volts DC and later 600v DC, allowing the system to run into Toronto (the Toronto network runs at 600v DC).

Comments

Unlike the city systems, the radial (interurban) operators used larger rail cars.

Radial routes ceased due to introduction of inter-urban buses and new highways that allowed for better access to many areas served by rail service.

Rail service returned to some of the communities served by the T&YRR by regional rail service of GO Transit in the 1970s.

External links
 
 
 Streetcar, Suburban and Interurban Map 1926: 1926 plan of electric rail transit in Toronto and Guelph areas by Roman Fomin published by  Transit Toronto. Large PDF.

Other Toronto area lines controlled by Sir William Mackenzie

 Niagara, St. Catharines and Toronto Railway
 Toronto Suburban Railway
 Toronto Railway Company

See also

 List of Ontario railways
 List of defunct Canadian railways

References

Hydro-Electric Railways
Rail transport in the Greater Toronto Area
Transit agencies in Ontario
Defunct Ontario railways
Interurban railways in Ontario
4 ft 10⅞ in gauge railways
1904 establishments in Ontario
1948 disestablishments in Ontario
Electric railways in Canada
Standard gauge railways in Canada
History of rail transport in the Regional Municipality of York